Johnny Grant (May 9, 1923 – January 9, 2008) was an American radio personality and television producer who also served as the honorary mayor of Hollywood, in which capacity he was often present at Hollywood community functions, including the unveiling of new stars on the Hollywood Walk of Fame. An intersection just north of Hollywood Boulevard and Highland Avenue is designated "Johnny Grant Way".

Early life and career
Grant was born in Goldsboro, North Carolina. He made his show business debut on the radio in 1939 as a local newscaster there. According to publicity released by the third annual Hollywood Film Festival in 1999:

Grant joined the Army Air Corps during World War II, hosting a daily radio show in New York City for servicemen and women. During this time, he interviewed many entertainment stars who were in the city. After his discharge, he stayed in New York, working as a reporter for station WINS.

Having moved to California, Grant appeared as a disc jockey on Los Angeles area radio stations KGIL (1949–50) and KMPC (1951–59). Along with Bing Crosby, Bob Hope and Frank Sinatra, Grant co-hosted the first national telethon ever produced, a fundraiser to help send America's athletes to the Helsinki Olympics in 1952. In the 1950s, he appeared in several films, often portraying uncredited fictional hosts. He played "Ed Harrison," an Ed Sullivan-type TV-show host, in the 1954 film White Christmas, and the Master of Ceremonies in the 1956 film The Girl Can't Help It.

Honorary Mayor of Hollywood
Grant was named honorary Mayor of Hollywood in 1980 by the Hollywood Chamber of Commerce and held the position for the rest of his life.  Grant was recommended for the position by the previous mayor of Hollywood, Monty Hall, the host of the hit game show Let's Make a Deal.

Grant was perhaps best known for having hosted the more than 500 celebrities he inducted into the Hollywood Walk of Fame with stars in the sidewalk. Grant claimed that his mission in life was bringing the Hollywood story to everyone. He played host to red-carpet arrivals at the Oscars, appeared in bit parts in movies and produced the annual Hollywood Christmas Parade. Grant also won two Emmy Awards.

In this capacity, he appears in the documentary Confessions of a Superhero, complaining about people who dress as superheroes seeking tips on Hollywood Boulevard.

Accomplishments
Grant served as a USO ambassador, joining the globe-trotting comedian Bob Hope in taking entertainers to war zones to perform for military personnel, and was the first recipient of the highest honor awarded by the USO, the United Service Organizations. Grant arranged for stars from Hollywood to visit wounded veterans of the Vietnam War at places such as San Antonio's Brooke Army Medical Center, including such actors as the late Christopher George.  Grant was also a retired major general in the California State Military Reserve, a volunteer backup and support force of the California National Guard. He had been chairman of the Los Angeles City Fire Commission, the Los Angeles County Social Service Commission, and the Burbank, California Police Commission. More recently, he had been a member of the Los Angeles City Cultural Heritage Commission.

Grant was the only person ever to twice receive an Order of California, the state's highest honor.

Grant said of all his accomplishments in Hollywood, he was most proud of three things: the Hollywood sign, the Walk of Fame and the Hollywood postmark. "We're not supposed to have one because we're not our own city," he said. "But I got it."

For contributions to the television industry, Johnny Grant was honored with a star on the Hollywood Walk of Fame at 6937 Hollywood Boulevard, and a second one for contributions to the Hollywood community at 6897 Hollywood Boulevard.

Grant was inducted into the North Carolina Music Hall of Fame in 2009.

Death
On January 9, 2008, Grant was not feeling well when he had lunch with Ana Martínez-Holler, a spokeswoman for the Hollywood Chamber of Commerce. Later that afternoon he relayed the same to his business manager, Jim Harper, stating he felt "lousy". Later that evening, Grant was found unconscious in his bed, in a 14th-floor suite he lived in at the Roosevelt Hotel, by an associate. He was the only full-time guest at the hotel.

Paramedics were called, but Grant was eventually pronounced dead after they arrived, apparently of natural causes, at the age of 84.

On January 11, 2008, Grant's sister, Peggy G. Adams of Goldsboro, North Carolina, announced that Johnny did not want a funeral service. Instead, there was a private memorial service held at the Pantages Theatre in Hollywood, California. Various publications reported that Grant wished for cremation, and for his ashes to be scattered under the Hollywood Sign. The Hollywood Chamber of Commerce has not set a timetable to name one or more persons to succeed Grant as mayor. Gary Owens was among those interested in the post, and he claimed that Grant tapped him as his successor. However, Owens died in early 2015.

After his death, Hollywood Chamber of Commerce President and CEO Leron Gubler replaced Grant as the new MC
of unveiling new stars on the Hollywood Walk of Fame.

References

External links
Official website

1923 births
2008 deaths
United States Army personnel of World War II
Television producers from California
Emmy Award winners
People from Goldsboro, North Carolina
Radio personalities from Los Angeles
United States Army Air Forces soldiers
United Service Organizations entertainers